Aerial firefighting also known as Waterbombing is the use of aircraft and other aerial resources to combat wildfires. The types of aircraft used include fixed-wing aircraft and helicopters. Smokejumpers and rappellers are also classified as aerial firefighters, delivered to the fire by parachute from a variety of fixed-wing aircraft, or rappelling from helicopters. Chemicals used to fight fires may include water, water enhancers such as foams and gels, and specially formulated fire retardants such as Phos-Chek.

Terminology
The idea of fighting forest fires from the air dates back at least as far as Friedrich Karl von Koenig-Warthausen's observations on seeing a blaze when overflying the Santa Lucia Range, California, in 1929.

A wide variety of terminology has been used in the popular media for the aircraft (and methods) used in aerial firefighting. The terms airtanker or air tanker generally refer to fixed-wing aircraft based in the United States; "airtanker" is used in official documentation. The term "waterbomber" is used in some Canadian government documents for the same class of vehicles, though it sometimes has a connotation of amphibians.

Air attack is an industry term used for the actual application of aerial resources, both fixed-wing and rotorcraft, on a fire. Within the industry, though, "air attack" may also refer to the supervisor in the air (usually in a fixed-wing aircraft) who supervises the process of attacking the wildfire from the air, including fixed-wing airtankers, helicopters, and any other aviation resources assigned to the fire. The Air Tactical Group Supervisor (ATGS), often called "air attack", is usually flying at an altitude above other resources assigned to the fire, often in a fixed-wing plane but occasionally (depending on assigned resources or the availability of qualified personnel) in a helicopter.

Depending on the size, location, and assessed potential of the wildfire, the "air attack" or ATGS person may be charged with initial attack (the first response of firefighting assets on fire suppression), or with extended attack, the ongoing response to and management of a major wildfire requiring additional resources including engines, ground crews, and other aviation personnel and aircraft needed to control the fire and establish control lines or firelines ahead of the wildfire.

Equipment 
A wide variety of helicopters and fixed-wing aircraft are used for aerial firefighting. In 2003, it was reported that "The U.S. Forest Service and Bureau of Land Management own, lease, or contract for nearly 1,000 aircraft each fire season, with annual expenditures in excess of US$250 million in recent years".

Helicopters

Helicopters may be fitted with tanks (helitankers) or they may carry buckets. Some helitankers, such as the Erickson AirCrane, are also outfitted with a front-mounted foam cannon. Buckets are usually filled by submerging or dipping them in lakes, rivers, reservoirs, or portable tanks. The most popular of the buckets is the flexible Bambi Bucket. Tanks can be filled on the ground (by water tenders or truck-mounted systems) or water can be siphoned from lakes, rivers, reservoirs, or a portable tank through a hanging snorkel. Popular firefighting helicopters include variants of the Bell 204, Bell 205, Bell 212, Boeing Vertol 107, Boeing Vertol 234, Sikorsky S-70 "Firehawk" and the Sikorsky S-64 Aircrane helitanker, which features a snorkel for filling from a natural or man-made water source while in hover. Currently the world's largest helicopter, the Mil Mi-26, uses a Bambi bucket.

Water and fire retardant bombers

Airtankers or water bombers are fixed-wing aircraft fitted with tanks that can be filled on the ground at an air tanker base or, in the case of flying boats and amphibious aircraft, by skimming water from lakes, reservoirs, or large rivers without needing to land.

Various aircraft have been used over the years for firefighting. In 1947, the United States Air Force and United States Forest Service experimented with military aircraft dropping water-filled bombs. The bombs were unsuccessful, and the use of internal water tanks was adopted instead. Though World War II- and Korean War-era bombers were for a long time the mainstay of the aerial firefighting fleet, newer purpose-built tankers have since come online. The smallest are the Single Engine Air Tankers (SEATs). Examples include the Air Tractor AT-802, which can deliver around 800 gallons of water or fire retardant solution in each drop, and the Soviet Antonov An-2 biplane. Both of these aircraft can be fitted with floats that scoop water from the surface of a body of water. Similar in configuration to the World War II–era Consolidated PBY Catalina, the Canadair CL-215 and its derivative the CL-415 are designed and built specifically for firefighting. The Croatian Air Force uses six CL-415s as well as six AT 802s for firefighting purposes.

Medium-sized modified aircraft include the Grumman S-2 Tracker (retrofitted with turboprop engines as the S-2T) as used by the California Department of Forestry & Fire Protection (CAL FIRE), as well as the Conair Firecat version developed and used by Conair Group Inc. of Canada, while the Douglas DC-4, the Douglas DC-7, the Lockheed C-130 Hercules, the Lockheed P-2 Neptune, and the Lockheed P-3 Orion – and its commercial equivalent, the L-188 Electra – have been used as air tankers. Conair also converted a number of Convair 580 and Fokker F27 Friendship turboprop airliners to air tankers.

The largest aerial firefighter ever used is a Boeing 747 aerial firefighter, known as the Global Supertanker, that can carry  fed by a pressurized drop system. The Supertanker was deployed operationally for the first time in 2009, fighting a fire in Spain. The tanker made its first American operation on August 31, 2009 at the Oak Glen Fire. It has since been replaced by a Boeing 747-400. Another wide body jetliner that is currently being used as an air tanker is the modified McDonnell Douglas DC-10-30 operated by the 10 Tanker Air Carrier company as the DC-10 Air Tanker.

The Russian Ministry of Emergency Situations operates convertible-to-cargo Ilyushin Il-76 airtankers that have been operating with  tanking systems, and several Beriev Be-200 jet powered amphibian aircraft.

Bombardier's Dash 8 Q Series aircraft are the basis of new, next-generation air tankers. Cascade Aerospace has converted two pre-owned Q400s to act as part-time water bomber and part-time transport aircraft for France's Sécurité Civile, while Neptune Aviation is converting a pre-owned Q300 as a prototype to augment its Lockheed P-2 Neptune aircraft. The Sécurité Civile also operates twelve Canadair CL-415 and nine Conair Turbo Firecat aircraft. Neptune Aviation also currently operates converted British Aerospace 146 jetliners as air tankers. The BAe 146 can carry up to 3,000 gallons of fire fighting retardant. Air Spray USA Ltd. of Chico, California has also converted the BAe 146 jetliner to the role of air tanker. Another modern-era passenger aircraft that has now been converted for aerial firefighting missions in the U.S. is the McDonnell Douglas MD-87 jetliner operated by Erickson Aero Tanker. The MD-87 can carry up to 4,000 gallons of fire fighting retardant. Coulson Aviation unveiled a Boeing 737-300 firefighting conversion in May 2017. Six aircraft have been purchased from Southwest Airlines for the RADS system conversion which was planned to enter service in December 2017. The 737 aircraft is smaller than the C-130Q which allows for a wider range of airfields to be utilized. Britt Coulson further stated the aircraft will be able to retain the current seat and galley configuration for tanker operations. On 22 November 2018, the 737 was used for the first time to fight a fire near Newcastle, Australia.

In July 2022, Airbus tested the aerial firefighting capacity of the A400M using a roll-on/roll-off kit comprising a 20-tonne water tank and piping allowing the load to be expelled from the end of the cargo ramp.

Comparison table of fixed-wing, firefighting tanker airplanes
All links, citations and data sources are listed in the paragraph above. For accident and grounding citations, see paragraph below table.

Category legend: Light: under , Medium: under , Heavy: under , Super heavy: over  – currently only used for the B747 Supertanker.

Other former military aircraft utilized as firefighting air tankers in the U.S. in the past included the B-17 and the PB4Y-2, a version of the B-24.

Leadplanes
The Lead Plane function directs the activities of the airtankers by both verbal target descriptions and by physically leading the airtankers on the drop run. The leadplane is typically referred to as a "Bird Dog" in Canada or "Supervision" aircraft in Australia. The O-2 Skymaster, Cessna 310 and OV-10 Bronco have been used as spotter and lead plane platforms. The Ontario Ministry of Natural Resources has also used the Cessna 337. The Beechcraft Baron was long used as a leadplane or air attack ship, but most were retired in 2003; more common now is the Beechcraft King Air and the Twin Commander 690. A Cessna Citation 500 jet owned by Air Spray (1967) LTd. was used by the British Columbia Ministry of Forests beginning in 1995 and used for two fire seasons to lead the very fast Electra L188 air tanker to the fires. This was the first time a jet aircraft was used as a lead plane or "bird dog". The Department of Parks and Wildlife in Western Australia operates a fleet of nine American Champion Scouts 8GCBC during the summer months as spotter aircraft and Air Attack platforms. The Provinces of Alberta and British Columbia and the Yukon Territories contract to supply Twin Commander 690 as bird dog aircraft for their air tanker fleets. Air Spray owns 9 Twin Commander 690 for use as bird dog aircraft.

Fleet grounding
In the United States, most of these aircraft are privately owned and contracted to government agencies, and the National Guard and the U.S. Marines also maintain fleets of firefighting aircraft. On May 10, 2004, The U.S. Forest Service (USFS) and the Bureau of Land Management (BLM) announced that they were cancelling contracts with operators of 33 heavy airtankers. They cited liability concerns and an inability to safely manage the fleet after the wing failure and resulting crash of a C-130A Hercules in California and a PB4Y-2 in Colorado during the summer of 2002. Both aged aircraft broke up in flight due to catastrophic fatigue cracks at the wing roots. After subsequent third-party examination and extensive testing of all USFS contracted heavy airtankers, three companies were awarded contracts and now maintain a combined fleet of 23 aircraft.

Fire retardant

Borate salts used in the past to fight wildfires have been found to sterilize the soil and be toxic to animals so are now prohibited. Newer retardants use ammonium sulfate or ammonium polyphosphate with attapulgite clay thickener or diammonium phosphate with a guar gum derivative thickener. Fire retardants often contain wetting agents, preservatives and rust inhibitors and are colored red with ferric oxide or fugitive color to mark where they have been dropped. Brand names of fire retardants for aerial application include Fortress and Phos-Chek.

Some water-dropping aircraft carry tanks of a guar gum derivative to thicken the water and reduce runoff.

Tactics and capabilities

Helicopters can hover over the fire and drop water or retardant. The S-64 Helitanker has microprocessor-controlled doors on its tank. The doors are controlled based on the area to be covered and wind conditions. Fixed-wing aircraft must make a pass and drop water or retardant like a bomber. Spotter (Air Tactical Group Supervisor) aircraft often orbit the fire at a higher altitude to coordinate the efforts of the smoke jumper, helicopter, media, and retardant-dropping aircraft, while lead planes fly low-level ahead of the airtankers to mark the trajectory for the drop, and ensure overall safety for both ground-based and aerial firefighters.

Water is not usually dropped directly on flames because its effect is short-lived. Fire retardants are not typically used to extinguish the fire, but instead are used to contain the fire, or slow it down to allow ground crews to contain it. Because of this, retardants are usually dropped in front of or around a moving fire, rather than directly on it, creating a firebreak. 

Aerial firefighting is most effectively used in conjunction with ground-based efforts, as aircraft are only one weapon in the firefighting arsenal. However, there have been cases of aircraft extinguishing fires long before ground crews were able to reach them.

Some firefighting aircraft can refill their tanks in mid-flight, by flying down to skim the surface of large bodies of water. One example is the Bombardier CL-415. This is particularly useful in rural areas where flying back to an airbase for refills may take too much time.

Incidents 
July 22, 1960: a North American B-25 Mitchell, N3446G SN 44-31466, operating as Tanker 66, impacted the earth during a water bombing run in Mill Canyon in the San Gabriel Mountains on the Magic Mountain Fire. The three crew members were killed.
June 27, 1969: a North American B-25 Mitchell, N9088Z SN 44-30733, operating as Tanker 8Z, crash landed on a sandbar after a multi engine failure shortly after takeoff in the Tanana River, near Fairbanks Alaska. All crew members survived with no injuries. The airplane was recovered in June 2013 and is now under restoration, flying under the name "Sandbar Mitchell".
August 13, 1994: a Lockheed C-130A, N135FF, operating as Tanker 82, impacted mountainous terrain near Pearblossom, California. All three crew members sustained fatal injuries.
June 21, 1995: a Douglas C-54G, N4989P, operating as Tanker 19, and a Beech B58P, N156Z, operating as Lead 56 collided in mid air in Ramona, California. 2 crew members of Tanker 19 as well as the pilot of Lead 56 were killed in the collision.
2002 airtanker crashes: loss of Tanker 130 and Tanker 123.
July 16, 2003: a Lockheed L188 Electra operated by Air Spray Ltd. struck the terrain on the side of a steep ridge while fighting a wildfire near Cranbrook BC. Two pilots were killed.
July 31, 2010: a Convair CV580 operated by Conair Aviation crashed battling a wildfire near Vancouver BC. The two pilots were killed in the crash.
May 21, 2011: a Bell 212 helicopter went down just offshore in Lesser Slave Lake, Alberta, killing the pilot.
June 3, 2012: a Lockheed P2V-7, operating as Tanker 11, crashed into mountainous terrain while fighting a wildfire in Utah. The 2 pilots were killed in the crash.
July 1, 2012: a Lockheed C-130 operated by the North Carolina Air National Guard's 145th Airlift Wing crashed in the Black Hills of South Dakota while supporting efforts to contain the White Draw Fire. Four airmen were killed, while two airmen survived the crash but sustained serious injuries.
October 24, 2013: a modified PZL-Mielec M-18A Dromader, operated by Rebel Ag crashed after the left wing separated in flight while conducting waterbombing operations west of Ulladulla, New South Wales, killing the pilot.
October 7, 2014: witness reports an S2T impacting terrain while engaging the Dog Rock Fire near Yosemite National Park California
May 22, 2015: an Air Tractor 802F Fire Boss amphibious air tanker, operated by Conair Aviation crashed battling a wildfire near Cold Lake, Alberta, killing the pilot.
July 10, 2015: an Air Tractor 802F Fire Boss amphibious air tanker, operated by Conair Aviation crashed and sank while scooping water from Puntzi Lake, British Columbia.The pilot was not injured.
17 August 2018: a BK117 owned by Sydney Helicopters crashed after hitting a tree while supporting operations on the Kingiman fire west of Ulladulla, New South Wales, Australia, with the pilot dying.
23 January 2020: C-130H N134CG of Coulson Aviation was destroyed when it crashed near Cooma, New South Wales during operations to fight a bushfire of the 2019–20 Australian bushfires. 3 fatalities.
14 August 2021: A Russian Be200 plane crashed while fighting wildfires in Turkey. Eight people were on board, all of whom were killed. 
27 October 2022: Canadair CL-415 I-DPCN fire fighting plane impacted the side of a mountain near Linguaglossa in Italy immediately after dropping its load. Both pilots died in the accident. 
6 February 2023: A Boeing 737-300 N619SW of Coulson Aviation crashed in Western Australia.

In popular culture 
The CGI movie Planes: Fire & Rescue depicts aerial firefighting.
The plot of Steven Spielberg's 1989 remake movie Always centers around aerial firefighting.
The 2017 movie Only the Brave depicts several instances of aerial firefighting.

See also
Glossary of wildfire terms
Smokejumper
Wildfire suppression
Modular Airborne FireFighting System
Aerial firefighting and forestry in southern Australia

Notes

References
 Keijsper, Gerard. "Water-Bombers Required!" Air Forces Monthly, London: Key Publishing, July 2008 Issue.
 Marsaly, Frédéric and Prétat, Samuel. "Bombardiers d'eau Canadair Scoopers" Editions Minimonde76, May 2012, ISBN 9-782954-181806.

 Pickler, Ron and Larry Milberry. Canadair: The First 50 Years. Toronto: CANAV Books, 1995. .

External links

The Effectiveness and Efficiency of Aerial Firefighting in Australia
Wolfgang Jendsch: "Aerial Firefighting", detailed book about international aerial firefighting
Wildlandfire.com fixed-wing gallery
wildfirenews.com
Meet the legendary Bambi Bucket® — 30 years of firefighting history 
Associated Aerial Firefighters website. Retrieved 2010-03-12
Peuch, Eric "Firefighting Safety in France", Eighth International Wildland Fire Summit, April 26-26, 2005
Drop Testing Airtankers: A Discussion of the Cup-and-Grid Method
How to Conduct Static Tests of Aerial Retardant Delivery Systems
Fire Aviation in Victoria Australia
CL-215 and CL-415 in action

 
Wildfire suppression
Articles containing video clips